The men's freestyle 58 kilograms wrestling competition at the 1998 Asian Games in Bangkok was held on 17 December and 18 December at the Thammasat Gymnasium 1.

The gold and silver medalists were determined by the final match of the main single-elimination bracket. The losers advanced to the repechage. These matches determined the bronze medalist for the event.

Schedule
All times are Indochina Time (UTC+07:00)

Results

Round 1

Round 2

Round 3

Round 4

Round 5

Finals

Final standing

References
Results
UWW Database

Freestyle 058 kg